Following is a list of all Article III United States federal judges appointed by President Grover Cleveland during his presidency. In total Cleveland appointed 45 Article III federal judges, including 4 Justices to the Supreme Court of the United States (including 1 Chief Justice), 11 judges to the United States courts of appeals and United States circuit courts and 30 judges to the United States district courts.

Additionally, Cleveland appointed 2 judges to the United States Court of Claims, an Article I tribunal.

The Judiciary Act of 1891, approved March 3, 1891, during the intervening administration of President Benjamin Harrison, established the United States courts of appeals. Prior to the passage of that act, United States Circuit Judges were appointed solely to the existing United States circuit courts. Subsequent to the passage of that act, United States Circuit Judges were concurrently appointed to both the United States courts of appeals and the United States circuit courts. This situation persisted until the abolition of the United States circuit courts on December 31, 1911. Starting January 1, 1912, United States Circuit Judges served only upon their respective United States court of appeals.

Thus, the 2 United States Circuit Judges appointed during Cleveland's first administration were appointed solely to the United States circuit court for their respective circuit and were reassigned by operation of law to serve concurrently on the United States court of appeals and United States circuit court on March 3, 1891. The 6 United States Circuit Judges appointed to numbered circuits during Cleveland's second administration were appointed concurrently to the United States court of appeals and United States circuit court.

The Court of Appeals for the District of Columbia (now the United States Court of Appeals for the District of Columbia Circuit) was established on February 9, 1893. As the United States Circuit Court for the District of Columbia had been abolished in 1863, the judges of this newly established court served only on the Court of Appeals and had no concurrent Circuit Court service. Cleveland appointed 3 judges to this newly established court during his second administration.

United States Supreme Court justices

First administration

Second administration

Court of appeals and circuit courts

First administration

Second administration

District courts

First administration

Second administration

Specialty courts

United States Court of Claims

Notes

Renominations

References
General

 

Specific

Sources
 Federal Judicial Center

Cleveland